Giovanni Amoroso (born 30 March 1949) is an Italian judge. He has been Judge of the Constitutional Court of Italy since 13 November 2017. 

Amoroso was born in Mercato San Severino on 30 March 1949. He was elected to the Constitutional Court by the Court of Cassation on 26 October 2017. He won 210 votes, with his competitor Renato Rordorf obtaining 11. At the time of his election Amoroso served as president of the labour section of the Court of Cassation. He was sworn in on 13 November 2017. Amaroso succeeded Alessandro Criscuolo.

Honour 
 : Knight Grand Cross of the Order of Merit of the Italian Republic (29 november 2018)

References

1949 births
Living people
Judges of the Constitutional Court of Italy
People from the Province of Salerno
Knights Grand Cross of the Order of Merit of the Italian Republic